Coriky is the self-titled debut album of the band Coriky which features Fugazi’s Ian Mackaye and Joe Lally, alongside Amy Farina of the Evens.

The first single, "Clean Kill", was released in February 2020. In May they released "Too Many Husbands".

Background

In 2015, Farina and MacKaye, who played together in The Evens, began playing music with Fugazi and The Messthetics bassist Joe Lally. In 2018, the group played their first show, now with the adopted moniker Coriky, which they'd announced at the bottom of a community bulletin email from Positive Force. During early 2020, Coriky released two songs, "Clean Kill" and "Too Many Husbands" via various free streaming services. Although the self-titled debut album was originally set for release on March 27, 2020, the COVID-19 lockdown enacted in the United States during March, 2020, delayed its release until June 12, 2020, in part to accommodate independent record stores closed due to the pandemic. The band eventually previewed their album at a free show in D.C.'s St. Stephen and the Incarnation Episcopal Church on February 22, 2020.

Release and reception

The Guardians Kitty Empire said "Coriky are as close to the much-missed Fugazi as it gets in 2020" and awarded it four stars. Adam Blyweiss of Treble said that while MacKaye wasn't "nearly the angry young man he once was...The songs on Coriky are as pointed as they are subtle". Stereogum named it "album of the week" and declared it "a triumphant record." On June 18, 2020 Bandcamp named Coriky "Album of the Day".

Laura Jane Grace named it her favorite album of the year, while Nathan Ellis (The Casket Lottery) and The Homeless Gospel Choir included it in their respective top 10s. Nate Newton of Converge named it one of his favorite albums of the year in a Facebook post.

Track listing

"Clean Kill" - 4:12
"Hard to Explain" - 3:03
"Say Yes" - 2:35
"Have a Cup of Tea" - 3:33
"Too Many Husbands" - 3:02
"BQM" - 1:52
"Last Thing" - 3:27
"Jack Says" - 2:33
"Shedileebop" - 3:36
"Inauguration Day" - 3:49
"Woulda Coulda" - 5:24

Personnel
Coriky
 Ian MacKaye – guitar, vocals
 Joe Lally – bass, vocals
 Amy Farina – drums, vocals

Additional Musicians
 Jason Farrell – mechanical design

Production
 Don Zientara – engineering, mixing, production
 Coriky – engineering, mixing, artwork, production
 T.J. Lipple – mastering
 Jason Farrell – cover design
 Robert Weston – lacquer cutting

References

2020 albums
Dischord Records albums